is a platform game developed by Konami and released in arcades in 1986. The side-scrolling game is based on Ishikawa Goemon, an outlaw in 16th-century Japan. It is the first game in the Goemon series.

Gameplay
Enemies charge and grab the character, ending his life unless the player jostles the control stick to break free. Later enemies also have projectile weapons that the player must dodge. They are defeated by throwing a found object at them or hitting them with an always-equipped pipe. Jumping on the enemies' heads will push them down a level or off the screen entirely. Levels feature either boss battles or a pile of gold bars at the end, worth various points depending on the level.

Ports
Microsoft released Mr. Goemon for its Game Room service in June 2010. Hamster Corporation released it for download on the PlayStation 4 in Japan on December 25, 2014 and in North America on September 22, 2015, under the Arcade Archives label.

Reception 
In Japan, Game Machine listed Mr. Goemon on their July 1, 1986 issue as being the seventeenth most-successful table arcade unit of the month.

References

External links
Official Arcade Archives minisite 

Mr. Goemon at Arcade History
Mr. Goemon'' at GameFAQs

1986 video games
Arcade video games
Ganbare Goemon games
Konami games
Nintendo Switch games
PlayStation 4 games
Video games set in Japan
Windows games
Xbox 360 games
Multiplayer and single-player video games
Konami arcade games
Video games developed in Japan
Hamster Corporation games